Aumyshevo (Äwmeş) is a rural locality (a village) in Tashtimerovsky Selsoviet, Abzelilovsky District, Bashkortostan, Russia. The population was 107 as of 2010. There are 4 streets.

Geography 
Aumyshevo is located 35 km north of Askarovo (the district's administrative centre) by road. Samarskoye is the nearest rural locality.

References 

Rural localities in Abzelilovsky District